Thomas Adda Dalu (born 1 January 1956) is a Ghanaian politician and member of the National Democratic Congress. He is the member of parliament for the Chiana-Paga Constituency in the Upper East Region of Ghana.

Early life and education 
Dalu hails from Chiana. He holds an MBA in Govern and Leadership

References 

Living people
Ghanaian MPs 2021–2025
People from Upper West Region
National Democratic Congress (Ghana) politicians
1956 births